The 2022 South and Central American Women's Junior Handball Championship was the first edition of the tournament, took place in Buenos Aires, Argentina, from 22 to 26 March 2022. It acted as the South and Central American qualifying tournament for the 2022 Women's Junior World Handball Championship.

Standings

Results
All times are local (UTC–3).

Team champion roster

See also
 South and Central American Women's Handball Championship

References

External links
Argentinean Handball Confederation website

South and Central American Junior
South and Central American Women's Junior Handball Championship
International handball competitions hosted by Argentina
Sports competitions in Buenos Aires
South and Central American Women's Junior Handball Championship
South and Central American Women's Junior Handball Championship